Richard Lewis Brewer Jr. (May 27, 1864 – April 5, 1947) was a Virginia politician. He represented Nansemond County in the Virginia House of Delegates, and served as that body's Speaker from 1920 until 1926.

In 1924 Brewer's nomination was seconded by Sarah Lee Fain, one of the first two female members of the Virginia House of Delegates; upon her recognition from the floor she received over a minute's worth of cheers and applause.

Brewer advised the Equal Suffrage League on suffrage strategy. He predicted that an amendment to the state constitution had a better chance to pass than the proposed 19th amendment to the federal constitution and urged the League to help introduce such an amendment.

References

External links
 
 

Speakers of the Virginia House of Delegates
Democratic Party members of the Virginia House of Delegates
Politicians from Suffolk, Virginia
1864 births
1947 deaths
People from Prince George County, Virginia